Kampung Pintu Padang is a traditional Malay village located within the outskirt of Gopeng, Perak. It is populated by the Rawa Malay community. The Darul Hikmah Orphanage is located here which was built by retired teachers, Hajjah Embun Bt Mohd Ali and his late husband, Haji Din B Kimi. Hajjah Embun was one of the recipients of NSTP-PWC Malaysian Humanitarian Award 2006 presented to her by the previous Prime Minister of Malaysia, Tun Abdullah Ahmad Badawi.

References

Villages in Perak